Thiessa Sickert (born February 18, 1993) is a Brazilian journalist, model and beauty pageant titleholder. She had been in various beauty pageants in the World. She started when she was 16 years old, winning the Miss Brasil Massachusetts 2009 in Boston. Then, in 2012, as Miss Minas Gerais she went from the state pageant to the national Miss Brasil, there, she was named the second runner up. In 2015, she was awarded the Miss Earth Brazil 2015 title by its organization (Look Top Beauty Organization) and represented
Brazil in the Miss Earth 2015 pageant in Vienna, Austria. In that year, Thiessa was crowned as Miss Earth-Fire 2015.

Biography

Early life and career beginnings
Prior in joining beauty pageants, Thiessa lived in Massachusetts. She also speaks English fluently aside from her native Portuguese.

Thiessa competed in a beauty pageant in USA through Miss Brazil USA at the age of 16. The pageant was created by the Brazilian producer Carlos Borges in 1991. Thiessa ended up as one of the semifinalists. It is actually unknown what would be the prize of winning the pageant but the winner where Thiessa joined, Marcela Granato, later represented Espírito Santo through Miss Brasil 2011.

On August 1, 2016, she was one of the guest judges in the final Miss Earth United States 2016 pageant in the Schlesinger Concert Hall, Washington, D.C.

2012: Miss Brasil
Thiessa was Uberaba's representative in the Miss Minas Gerais 2012 pageant. She competed with 102 other contestants where she was declared as the winner. The event took place in Inimá Museum of Paula, in Belo Horizonte.

Becoming the representative of her state, Minas Gerais, Thiessa was able to compete in Miss Brasil 2012 pageant which was held in Fortaleza. There, Thiessa almost got the top plum by finishing second runner up. The title was won by Gabriela Markus

2015: Miss Earth
As Miss Earth Brazil 2015, Thiessa was named Miss Earth Fire. The Miss Earth 2015 title was conferred upon Miss Philippines Angelia Ong who succeeded another Filipina, Jamie Herrell who was Miss Earth 2014.

Colocação Miss Brasil 2012

References

Living people
Miss Earth 2015 contestants
Brazilian beauty pageant winners
People from Uberaba
Miss Brazil
Miss Earth
1993 births